Wisdom Budu Ihunwo (born 27 December 1976) is the Bishop of Niger Delta North in the Anglican Province of Niger Delta in the Church of Nigeria.

He was consecrated as Bishop of Niger Delta North on 3 June 2018.

Ihunwo is a graduate of the University of Nigeria Nsukka and has a master's degree from the University of Port Harcourt.

He was Vicar of Saint Paul's Cathedral in the Anglican Diocese of Port Harcourt.

References

Living people
Anglican bishops of Niger Delta North
Anglican archbishops of Niger Delta
21st-century Anglican bishops in Nigeria
University of Nigeria alumni
University of Port Harcourt alumni
1976 births